The 2002–03 Scottish Third Division was won by Greenock Morton who, along with second placed East Fife, gained promotion to the Second Division. East Stirlingshire finished bottom.

Table

Events
In the course of a 3-1 loss to Albion Rovers, East Stirlingshire used four goalkeepers.
Starting keeper Chris Todd was taken off injured after only seven minutes to be replaced by Scott Findlay who was sent off for fouling John Bradford 40 yards from goal eight minutes into the second half.
Findlay was replaced by Graham McLaren, who was in turn shown the red card when he fouled Charles McLean inside the box to concede a penalty kick. Kevin McCann took over and tipped McLean's penalty effort over the crossbar

Attendance

The average attendance for Scottish Third Division clubs for season 2002/03 are shown below:

References

Scottish Third Division seasons
3
4
Scot